Alessandro Lopes Pereira, as known as Alessandro Lopes (born 13 February 1984) is a Brazilian footballer who plays as a defender. He played for Chungju Hummel in K League Challenge.

References

External links 

1984 births
Living people
Association football defenders
Brazilian footballers
Brazilian expatriate footballers
Club Athletico Paranaense players
Grêmio Foot-Ball Porto Alegrense players
Associação Atlética Portuguesa (Santos) players
Avaí FC players
Joinville Esporte Clube players
Ipatinga Futebol Clube players
Paraná Clube players
ABC Futebol Clube players
Daejeon Hana Citizen FC players
Chungju Hummel FC players
K League 1 players
K League 2 players
Expatriate footballers in South Korea
Brazilian expatriate sportspeople in South Korea
People from Ponta Grossa
Sportspeople from Paraná (state)